The Foreign Assistance Act (et seq.) is a United States law governing foreign aid policy. It outlined the political and ideological principles of U.S. foreign aid, significantly overhauled and reorganized the structure U.S. foreign assistance programs, legally distinguished military from nonmilitary aid, and created a new agency, the United States Agency for International Development (USAID) to administer nonmilitary economic assistance programs. Following its enactment by Congress on September 4, 1961, President John F. Kennedy signed the Act into law on November 3, 1961, issuing Executive Order 10973 detailing the reorganization.

USAID unified already existing U.S. aid efforts, combining the economic and technical assistance operations of the International Cooperation Administration, the loan activities of the Development Loan Fund, the local currency functions of the Export-Import Bank, and the agricultural surplus distribution activities of the Food for Peace program of the Department of Agriculture.

The Act provides that no assistance is to be provided to a government which "engages in a consistent pattern of gross violations of internationally recognized human rights, including torture or cruel, inhuman, or degrading treatment or punishment, prolonged detention without charges, causing the disappearance of persons by the abduction and clandestine detention of those persons, or other flagrant denial of the right to life, liberty, and the security of person, unless such assistance will directly benefit the needy people in such country."

The Act also provides that no assistance is to be provided to any Communist country. However, the President may waive this prohibition if he determines that such assistance is vital to the national security of the United States, that the country is not controlled by the international Communist conspiracy, and that the assistance will promote the country's independence from international Communism. The President may also remove a country from the application of this provision for a certain time which the President determines. In order to remove a country from the application of this provision, the President must determine and report to Congress that such action is important to the national security of the United States.

The Act was amended in 2004 specific to the treatment of orphans and other vulnerable children. This amendment allows the president to provide aid to the peoples of other countries to look after children in cases of HIV/AIDS and to set up schools and other programs for the advancement of child treatment.

Under the authority of this Act on March 16, 2022, President Biden authorized $800 million in new security assistance to Ukraine.

Amendments to 1961 Act
Chronological timeline of amendments and revisions to the Foreign Assistance Act of 1961.

See also
 Alliance for Progress
 Arms Export Control Act
 Foreign Military Sales Act of 1968
 Iran-Contra
 Office of Public Safety (OPS)
 U.S. Foreign Policy
 War on Drugs
 War on Terror

Notes

External links
 Foreign Assistance Act of 1961, as amended, in HTML/PDF/details in the GPO Statute Compilations collection
 Information from USAID
 Foreign Operations Appropriations: General Provisions
 FAA-related documents and publications available through USAID's Development Experience Clearinghouse
 
 

1961 in American law
United States foreign relations legislation
United States Agency for International Development
1961 in international relations